Dame Alison Jane Carnwath  (born January 1953) is a British businesswoman, and former chairman of Land Securities.

Early life and education
Alison Jane Carnwath was born in January 1953. She received a bachelor's degree in economics and German from the University of Reading in 1975.

Career

Executive
Carnwath began her career with Peat Marwick Mitchell, now KPMG, where she qualified and practiced as a chartered accountant from 1975 to 1980.

She then moved into corporate finance. She worked from 1980 to 1982 at Lloyds Bank International, and from 1982 to 1993 at J. Henry Schroder Wagg & Co in London and New York. In 1993 she became a senior partner at the financial advisory firm Phoenix Partnership. The firm was taken over by Donaldson, Lufkin & Jenrette (DLJ) in late 1997; she continued working for DLJ until 2000.

Non-executive 
Carnwath has held several board roles. These have included Vitec Group plc (as chair), Welsh Water, Friends Provident plc, Gallaher Group, MF Global Inc (as chair), Barclays, Man Group plc, Land Securities Group plc (as chair), UK private equity firm Livingbridge (as chair), Zurich Insurance, Paccar, BASF, and BP (she resigned from BP 'for personal and professional reasons' in January 2021).

She is also a senior advisor to Evercore Partners.

Honours
She was created a Dame Commander of the Order of the British Empire in the 2014 New Year Honours for her services to business.

References

1953 births
Alumni of the University of Reading
British businesspeople
Living people
Date of birth missing (living people)
Place of birth missing (living people)
Dames Commander of the Order of the British Empire